In music, Op. 13 stands for Opus number 13. Compositions that are assigned this number include:

 Bartók – The Wooden Prince
 Beethoven – Piano Sonata No. 8
 Britten – Piano Concerto
 Dvořák – Symphony No. 4
 Enescu – Symphony No. 1
 Fauré – Violin Sonata No. 1
 Glazunov – Stenka Razin
 Kodály – Psalmus Hungaricus
 Mendelssohn – String Quartet No. 2
 Nielsen – String Quartet No. 1
 Rachmaninoff – Symphony No. 1
 Schumann – Symphonic Studies
 Strauss – Piano Quartet
 Tchaikovsky – Symphony No. 1